Erythroplatys is a genus of beetles in the family Cerambycidae, containing the following species:

 Erythroplatys boliviensis Clarke, 2012
 Erythroplatys cardinalis Monné & Fragoso, 1990
 Erythroplatys corallifer White, 1855
 Erythroplatys rugosus (Lucas, 1857)
 Erythroplatys simulator Gounelle, 1911

References

Rhinotragini